Jesper Kongstad was Chairman of the Administrative Council of the European Patent Organisation from 2010 to September 2017. Until September 2017, he was also Director General of the Danish Patent and Trademark Office. In 2009, he was candidate for the position of President of the European Patent Office, which was to be filled on 1 July 2010, but, in December 2009, he withdrew his candidacy. Jesper Kongstad had been elected as Chairman of the Administrative Council of the European Patent Organisation on 29 June 2010. He took up office on 1 July 2010 for a period of three years, later extended to six years.

References

Further reading
 Questions by epi to the candidates for the position as President of the EPO, Mr. Jesper Kongstad by the European Patent Institute (epi), October 2009.

Danish civil servants
Living people
European Patent Organisation people
Year of birth missing (living people)